Goon-baiting is an interaction between the prisoner and the guard, or an oppressor, whereby the prisoner, aiming to ensure he is not endangered, ‘plays mind games, or does actions, to confuse or enrage an oppressor to the point of where he’d lose his composure.’ Goon-baiting was a term used in WWII.

In WWII, in prisoner-of-war camps, goon-baiting was used amongst prisoners of all nationalities. The French sang banned songs without moving their lips at Appell. It was not quite sabotage; it was an art form, and the aim of goon-baiting was to achieve maximum impact without endangering yourself. Though not all prisoners participated in goon-baiting, some thinking it was bad manners, others thinking it gave any oppressor an opportunity, or more reason to retaliate, therefore it only brought with it more suffering.

Examples of goon-baiting include, one prisoner being counted more than once in Appell in order to cover for a missing comrade, or to sow some confusion; or exaggerated salutes.

Etymology
Some claim the roots of the term ‘goon’ come from a 1930s cartoon character called Alice the Goon and people also used the term goon to describe an incompetent professional bully. Pete Tunstall claims a fellow prisoner called Bill Fowler was the first to ever coin the term amongst the prisoners and that Fowler referenced a well known comic strip.

See also
 Milgram experiment
 Military slang
 RAF slang
 Stanford prison experiment
 Taking the mick

Footnotes

Sources
 
 

 

Group processes
Imprisonment and detention
Military slang and jargon